The Crooked River (Michigan) is a river in Emmet and Cheboygan counties in the U.S. state of Michigan. It forms part of the Inland Waterway of Michigan. The river is the subject of the Sufjan Stevens song "Alanson, Crooked River" from his 2003 album Michigan.

References

Rivers of Michigan
Rivers of Emmet County, Michigan
Rivers of Cheboygan County, Michigan